The Solomon Islands Ambassador in New York City is the official representative of the Government in Honiara to the Government of the United States and also Permanent Representative to the Headquarters of the United Nations.

List of representatives 

United States–Solomon Islands relations

References 

 
Solomon Islands
Solomon Islands–United States relations
United States